Vilakkudy is a village in Kollam district in the state of Kerala, India. Vilakkudy is a part of Pathanapuram Block Panchayat and Kollam district Panchayat.

Demographics
At the 2001 India census, Vilakkudy had a population of 32,677 with 15,773 males and 16,904 females.

References

2. Parankamveettil Family, 129. . Retrieved 23 February 2011

Villages in Kollam district